Inocencio or Inocêncio may refer to:

Surname

Places 
 Dom Inocêncio, municipality in the state of Piauí in the Northeast region of Brazil
 Frei Inocêncio, municipality in the state of Minas Gerais in the Southeast region of Brazil

See also 
 Innocencio
 Innocence (disambiguation)
 Innocent (disambiguation)